Dublin Ballyfermot was a parliamentary constituency represented in Dáil Éireann, the lower house of the Irish parliament or Oireachtas from 1977 to 1981. The constituency elected 3 deputies (Teachtaí Dála, commonly known as TDs) to the Dáil, using proportional representation by means of the single transferable vote (PR-STV).

History 
The constituency was created in 1977, under the Electoral (Amendment) Act 1974, taking in parts of the former Dublin South West constituency, as part of the redistribution of constituencies which attempted to secure the re-election of the outgoing Fine Gael–Labour Party government. The constituency was abolished in 1981 with most of it becoming part of the new constituency of Dublin West.

Boundaries 
It covered Ballyfermot, together with most of the Crumlin and Kilmainham areas of Dublin city. It consisted of the following wards of the county borough of Dublin: Ballyfermot A, Ballyfermot B, Ballyfermot C, Ballyfermot D, Ballyfermot E, Ballyfermot F, Ballyfermot G, Crumlin A, Crumlin B, Crumlin C, Crumlin E, Kilmainham A, Kilmainham C.

TDs

1977 general election

See also 
Dáil constituencies
Politics of the Republic of Ireland
Historic Dáil constituencies
Elections in the Republic of Ireland

References

External links 
Oireachtas Members Database

Dáil constituencies in County Dublin (historic)
1977 establishments in Ireland
1981 disestablishments in Ireland
Constituencies established in 1977
Constituencies disestablished in 1981